Geastrum fornicatum, common name known as the acrobatic earthstar or the arched earthstar, is an inedible species of mushroom in the family Geastraceae. Like other earthstar mushrooms, the thick outer skin splits open at maturity to expose the spore sac to the elements; the specific epithet fornicatum (Latin for 'arched' or 'vaulted') refers to the arched shape of the rays which extend downwards to rest on the mycelial sac and elevate the spore sac.

History
When first described in the late 17th century, the species was called Fungus anthropomorphus due to its resemblance to the human figure. In his 1799 treatise Colored Figures of English Fungi or Mushrooms, English naturalist James Sowerby wrote:So strange a vegetable has surprised many; and in the year 1695 it was published under the name of Fungus Anthropomorphus, and figured with human faces on the head. It is at first roundish; in ripening the head bursts through the two coats or wrappers; the inner wrapper, detaching itself from the outer, becomes inverted, connected only by the edges; the coats most constantly split into four parts.

Description

The immature fruit body is roughly spherical in shape, typically  in diameter, and dark brown in color. At maturity, the exoperidium (outer layer) splits into four to five rays which curve backwards so as to elevate the fruit body and raise the spore sac for optimal spore dispersal; the tips of the rays remain attached to a basal cup. The spore sac contains an ostiole, a small opening near the apex. The exoperidium is attached to the soil by rhizomorphs. Spores are spherical, warted, thick-walled, nonamyloid and 5–6 μm. In mass, the spores have a dark-brown color.

This species is found singly or in small groups under bushes and in deciduous woods. It is inedible.

Similar species include Geastrum minimum and Geastrum quadrifidum.

Antimicrobial activity

Methanol extracts of G. fornicatum were shown to be inhibitory to the growth of various bacteria that are pathogenic to humans, including Bacillus subtilis, Escherichia coli, Klebsiella pneumoniae, Pseudomonas aeruginosa, Salmonella typhimurium, and Streptococcus pyogenes, as well as the fungi Candida albicans, Rhodotorula rubra, and Kluyveromyces fragilis.

References

External links
California Fungi
Roger's Mushrooms

fornicatum
Fungi described in 1778
Fungi of Europe
Inedible fungi
Taxa named by William Hudson (botanist)